USS Dale may refer to:

, was a sloop-of-war, launched in 1839 and transferred to the Maryland Naval Militia in 1895
, was a  destroyer, launched in 1935 and struck in 1945
, was a  guided-missile destroyer leader, launched in 1962, reclassified as (CG-19) in 1975 and struck in 1994

United States Navy ship names